Google App Maker was a low-code application development tool, developed by Google Inc. as part of the G Suite family.  It allowed developers or its users to build and deploy custom business apps on the web.

Launched in 2016, it was accessible to its users with any G Suite Business and Enterprise subscription and G Suite for Education edition.

Google App Maker allowed users to drag and drop widgets into a visual editor with built-in templates. The apps could be customized using HTML, CSS, JavaScript, JQuery and Google's own material design visual framework.

PC Magazine rated Google App Maker 3.5/5.

Following Google's acquisition of AppSheet, the App Maker editor and user apps was shut down on January 19, 2021. New app creation was disabled on April 15, 2020.

See also 

 Google Workspace
Google App Script
 List of Google products

References

External links 
 Official website

App Maker
App Maker